Johan Per Erik Andersson (born May 2, 1987) is a Swedish professional ice hockey centre currently playing for Spartiates de Marseille of the FFHG Division 2 in France.

Playing career
Andersson played his under-20 (U20) hockey with Södertälje SK, he started out with the under-18 (U18) team during the 2003–04 season in the J18 Allsvenskan.  During that season he also played 9 games with the Södertälje SK under-20 team in the J20 SuperElit league.

In 2004-05 he split time between the U18 and U20 teams again as well as playing for Sweden in the IIHF World U18 Championship and 16 other international games for Sweden.

2005-06 saw Andersson make his SHL (Elitserien) debut with Södertälje SK, playing one game in the top-level league.  He spent the remainder of 2005–06 with the U20 team and played for Sweden U20 and Sweden U19 teams.

Andersson played for Södertälje SK again in 2006-07 splitting time between J20 SuperElit and the HockeyAllsvenskan.

In 2007-08 Andersson signed with Hammarby IF and played the full season in HockeyAllsvenskan, however the team went bankrupt after the season and he was forced to move on to Almtuna IS for 2008–09.

After two years with Almtuna IS playing in the HockeyAllsvenskan he signed a one-year contract with AIK to play in the SHL (Elitserien at the time) for 2010-11  Andersson then signed a one-year contract with Timrå for the 2011-12 in which he only played 11 games including the Kvalserien.

Having left Timrå after the Kvalserien in which Timrå were relegated to HockeyAllsvenskan, Andersson went back to Södertälje SK to a one-year contract for the 2012-13 season.  Andersson then re-signed with Södertälje SK for the 2013-14 season.

Andersson has since had spells with AIK, Rungsted Seier Capital, Ducs de Dijon, two seasons with Dundee Stars - whom he captained in 2018-19 - and Marseille.

Career statistics
Updated November 28, 2013

References

External links

Living people
1987 births
AIK IF players
Almtuna IS players
Ducs de Dijon players
Dundee Stars players
Hammarby Hockey (1921–2008) players
People from Nynäshamn Municipality
Rungsted Seier Capital players
Södertälje SK players
Swedish ice hockey centres
Timrå IK players
Sportspeople from Stockholm County
Swedish expatriate ice hockey players in Denmark
Swedish expatriate ice hockey people
Swedish expatriate sportspeople in France
Expatriate ice hockey players in Scotland
Expatriate ice hockey players in France